Chronic Future is the self-titled first album of the band Chronic Future. It was released on September 9, 1996, with the members of the band having an average age of only 15. The album became an instant success locally, but never reached the mainstream.

The album was re-released on August 12, 1997 as simply Chronic with an alternate track listing, also featuring one extra track titled "Buster Brown". The re-released version was released by Tommy Boy Records. Currently, both versions of the album are out of print, and can only be found on sites such as Amazon and eBay.

A party video with strange lighting was made for the track "Insomniac", featuring a club with the band playing, as well as a first-person exploration of the club. To date, it is one of only two Chronic Future music videos, the other being the video for "Time and Time Again" from the album Lines in My Face.

Track listing

All lyrics written by Mike Busse.

Chronic Future track listing

Chronic reissue track listing

Personnel

Members
Mike Busse – lead vocals, backing vocals
Ben Collins – lead vocals, guitar, backing vocals
Brandon Lee – bass guitar, backing vocals
Barry Collins – drums, percussion

Other Personnel
John Villagomez – art direction, design, imaging
Mike Woods – assistant engineer 
Jay Lean – producer, engineer, mixing
Pat Amore – engineer

References

1996 debut albums
Chronic Future albums